The Universidad Autónoma del Estado de México (UAEM) (Autonomous University of Mexico State) is a public university in the State of Mexico, Mexico. It is the largest university institution in the state with over 84,500 students, with its central campus located in the state capital of Toluca. Formalised as a university under the UAEM name in 1956, the institution traces its origins back to 1828 with the foundation Instituto Literario del Estado de México, in the former state capital of Tlalpan. In 1943 the institution was augmented to become the Instituto Científico y Literario de Toluca (ICLA), and thirteen years later obtaining its present name and institutional status.

See also 
Redalyc

References

External links 
 University website

Autonomous University of Mexico State
Toluca